The 1925–26 Scottish Cup was the 48th staging of Scotland's most prestigious football knockout competition. The tournament began on 23 January 1926 and ended on 10 April 1926. The cup was won by St Mirren, who defeated the previous years cup winners Celtic 2–0 in the final.

Fixtures & Results

First round 

Source:

First round replay 

Source:

Second First round replay 

Source:

Second round 

Source:

Second round replay 

Source:

Third round 

Source:

Third round replay 

Source:

Second Third round replay 

Source:

Quarter-finals 

Source:

Quarter-final replay

Semi-finals

Final

Teams

See also
1925–26 in Scottish football

References

External links
RSSSF site
1925/26 Scottish Cup London Hearts

Scottish Cup seasons
1925–26 domestic association football cups
Cup